The Clan Murtagh O'Conor (Irish: Clan Muircheartaigh Uí Conchobhair) were descendants of Irish High-King Toirdelbach Ua Conchobair, through his son, Murtogh Moynagh O'Conor (d.1210), tánaiste of Connacht. They have been defined by Katherine Simms as:

... the earliest, most aristocratic and best documented example of increasing nomadism in the northern half of Ireland in the late middle ages. ... In spite of the fact that they were a very numerous branch of the O'Conor family, who supplied five kings to the throne of Connacht, they seem to have vanished away in the early fifteenth century, never to be heard of again.

Clan Murtagh kings of Connacht
 Cathal McConnor Roe O'Conor, reigned 1280-1288
 Magnus McConnor Roe O'Conor, reigned 1288-1293
 Hugh Breifne O'Conor (i.e., of Breifne), reigned 1309-1310
 Rory O'Connor, reigned 1315-1316
 Hugh McHugh Breifne O'Conor, reigned 1342-1343, Died 1350

Short history
The family held a position of overlordship in south Mayo prior to the Norman occupation of Connacht by Richard Mór de Burgh. Their area of control was likely conterminous with the Diocese of Mayo recognised at the Synod of Kells in 1152, but which had not existed in 1111. After the Norman take-over in 1235 a section came to an accommodation  with the Butler dynasty in Umhaill and then Erris, part of their former overlordship, until finally being expelled in 1274. Others moved east to the King's Cantreds in the 1240s and cooperated with resistance to further Norman conquest. They supported Áed na nGall in kings' sons formations of horse-borne raiding parties. They attempted thereafter with short periods of success to contest for the title of the rump-Kingdom of Connacht with their cousins, the descendants of Cathal Crobhdearg Ua Conchobair. Increasingly excluded from power after the reign of Magnus O'Conor, they left Machaire Connacht and by the 1290s their main base of activity was in Breifne O'Rourke where they developed formations of landless nomadic creaghts following their cattle-herds. A creaght was a grouping of families that in one body followed a herd, depending on it for their pastoralist existence. After the 1360s their standing was greatly reduced as former allies and enemies combined against their disruptive presence in Fermanagh and both East and West Breifne. They then removed to County Roscommon as supporters of the O'Conor Roe, gradually fading into obscurity.

The last annal entry concerning them comes from the Annals of Connacht, 1474, when:
Donnchad son of Muirchertach son of Aed O Conchobair of the remnant of the Clann Muirchertaig [i.e. d'iarsma Clainni Murcertuig] died at Toberelva in Mag nAi.

Family tree (simplified) 

 Kg. = King of Connacht

                         Tairrdelbach, King of Connacht & Ard Rí na hÉireann, 1088-1156.
                                   |
     __|
    |                              |                                           |
    |                              |                                           |
    Ruaidrí			Muirchertach Muimnech	       Cathal Crobhdearg, 1153-1224,
  c.1115-1198  	      		Tainiste of Connacht		      Kg. 1202-24. 	
  King of Connacht,                d.1210                       Ancestor of Ó Conchubhair Ruadh & Ó Conchubhair Donn          			
  & Ard Rí na hÉireann    	      |                      	
     				  |
 				Conor Ruad, d.1245
     __|
     |                                                                         |
     |                                                                         |
     Cathal Ruad							  Maghnus
     Kg. Conn. 1280-88; 1293                                              Kg. Conn 1288-1293
     |
     |
     |                               |                       |
     |                               |                       |
     Conor Ruad  		 Aodh Breifnech   	  Ruaidri
     claimant. 1296	         Kg. Conn. 1309-10	  Kg. Conn. 1315-16                      	
     				    |
         |
         |                               |                       |
  	Aodh	 	          Cathal		    Ruaidri
  	Kg. Conn. 1342-43	      Tainiste 	  	        Tainiste
         d.1350			       d.1366			d.1380

References

Irish families
O'Conor dynasty
Gaels